Soumya Bollapragada is an Indian actress, writer, director and model. She is the niece of actress Gautami and great-granddaughter of the Indian thinker U.G.Krishnamurti and has acted in Telugu films primarily. She also is related to Nirmala Sitaraman through her mother.Soumya is also the Rakhi sister of Prince Manvendra Singh Gohil the first openly gay Prince in the world; belonging to Rajpipla in Gujarat.

Life and career

Her father Divakar was an engineer in the merchant Navy, her mother a housewife and she has a younger brother Sourabh who did his master's degree in CS from Northeastern University, Boston and joined Arista Networks in New Hampshire as a Software Engineer. She graduated from St. Joseph's College for Women. She has studied journalism and dreamt of becoming a journalist. She holds a bachelor's degree in English literature and Psychology from Andhra University. She was one of the six finalists in the Miss South India Contest in which girls from Karnataka, Kerala, Tamil Nadu and AP had participated. She had also won the Ms. Personality round for her height in the Miss Andhra contest held in Hyderabad in January 2005 and the Miss NIFD title organised by the National Institute of Fashion Design in Visakhapatnam in April 2005. She got trained under the famous Koushik Ghosh for this pageant.

She started with modelling in college and got trained under Koushik Ghosh. She modelled for KPL Coconut Oil ad in Kerala and also acted in Sun Flower shopping mall ad, Anarkali Boutique ad and others.

She ran a monthly magazine Evoke for three and half years in Vizag. In addition to this, she has won three International awards in Poetry at the age of 14.

She made her debut in the cross over film The Angrez. She has a theatre background and that helped her to get in films. She acted in a play in Andhra University and was spotted by Kuntaa Nikkil, director of The Angrez. This film is still considered a cult classic, having millions of fans across the globe. She also acted in the English film Stalemate and played the role of an assistant surgeon. She made her debut in Tamil in Thozha with the stars of Chennai 600028. She was paired with Vasanth Vijay in this film and she had a remake of the hit song “Oru Naayagan” to her credit in this film. She also played an important role in Ravi Krishna starring Netru Indru Naalai (Ninna Nedu Repu in Telugu). She was part of Mugguru produced by Movie Mogul D Ramaniadu and directed by V N Aditya. She is awaiting the release of Poga which is a 4D horror film, and Ramadandu.

She is the founder of the theatre group Applause – The Theatre People. She also hosted Jollywood Express, a comedy show with actor AVS on Gemini TV. She also hosted Zee Sound Party on Zee Telugu. She was also the winner of the country wide contest held by famous author Ashwin Sanghi or Shawn Highins as he is also called as. His context of lucky 13 saw Soumya topping the charts as the winner of the lucky 13 contest. She is a writer for Chhota Bheem and a few other successful animated shows and is also into events.

Filmography

References

External links 
 

Living people
Telugu actresses
Actresses in Telugu cinema
Actresses in Tamil cinema
Television personalities from Andhra Pradesh
Indian stage actresses
21st-century Indian actresses
Indian film actresses
Andhra University alumni
Actresses from Visakhapatnam
Year of birth missing (living people)
Actresses in Telugu theatre
Actresses in Urdu cinema